Sardar Vallabhbhai Patel National Police Academy (SVPNPA) is the civil service training institution in India. The institute trains Indian Police Service (IPS) officers before they are sent to their respective state cadres to carry out their duties. The academy is in Shivrampalli, Hyderabad, Telangana, India.

History

The academy was established on 15 September 1948, as the Central Police Training College (CPTC). In 1967, the Institution was renamed as the National Police Academy (NPA). Later, in 1974, it was named after India's first Minister of Home Affairs Sardar Vallabhbhai Patel who was responsible for creating the All India Services and for establishing a training institution to train IPS officers. In 1975, the Academy attained its current shape which once was the biggest police training grounds of Nizam of Hyderabad at Hyderabad.

Campus
The 277 acre campus is located in Hyderabad on the National Highway 44.

Training
It trains officers of the Indian Police Service, who have been selected through the All-India Civil Services Examination. The trained officers will be posted as Assistant Superintendent of Police (ASP) in their respective states under whom the other sub-ranks of police force will be working. The recruitment of sub-ranks such as constables, sub-inspectors, inspectors, Deputy Superintendent of Police is each state's prerogative and will be done by respective state director generals of police. The IPS cadre is controlled by the Home Ministry of the Government of India and the officer of this service can only be appointed or removed by an order of the President of India.

Apart from the Basic Training Course for IPS officers the Academy conducts three In-service Management Development Programmes for officers of Superintendent of Police, Deputy Inspector General of Police and Inspector General levels of the Indian Police Service; 'Training of Trainers' Courses for the trainers of police training institutions in the country; IPS Induction Training Course for State Police Service Officers; and short specialised thematic courses, seminars and workshops on professional subjects for all levels of police officers. Foreign police officers and other officers belonging to IRS/IAS/IFS/Judiciary/CAPF, public sector undertakings, nationalised banks, insurance companies etc. also attend specialised courses conducted here from time to time. The academy is affiliated to Osmania University for conducting courses on police subjects for IPS officers.

President's colours

In recognition of the outstanding achievements of the academy and its service to the nation, the academy received the President's Colours on its 40th anniversary on 15 September 1988.

Organisation
The Academy is headed by a Director, an IPS officer of the rank of Director General of Police (3-star rank) and assisted by 2 Joint Directors of the rank of Inspector General of Police, 3 Deputy Directors of the rank of Deputy Inspector General of Police, and 20 Assistant Directors. The Assistant Directors include 8 IPS/SPS officers of the rank of Superintendent of Police from state cadres, a Forensic Scientist, a Judicial Service Officer, a specialist each in Training Methodology, Computers and Wireless. The sanctioned strength of the faculty includes management professors, reader in Behavioural Sciences, reader in Teaching Methodology, medical officers, junior scientific officer, Hindi instructor, photographic officer and chief drill instructor. The supporting staff include administrative, ministerial and medical staff and other Group D employees.

List of directors

See also
 Indian Police Service
 Law enforcement in India
 Indian Police Foundation and Institute
 Bureau of Police Research and Development
 National Crime Records Bureau
 NDCRTC
 Telangana State Police Academy

References

External links
 Official SVPNPA website

Universities and colleges in Hyderabad, India
Police academies in India
1948 establishments in India
Ministry of Home Affairs (India)